The 2007 Brut Sun Bowl, part of the 2007-08 NCAA football bowl games season, was played on December 31, 2007, at Sun Bowl Stadium on the campus of the University of Texas, El Paso, between the South Florida Bulls and the Oregon Ducks.

The Ducks were playing without quarterback Dennis Dixon, who finished fifth in the Heisman Trophy balloting but who had season-ending ACL surgery in November. Redshirt freshman Justin Roper made his first collegiate start in place of Dixon and threw for four touchdowns to tie a Sun Bowl record and lead the Ducks to a 56–21 victory.

The game marked the 40th consecutive telecast by CBS Sports.  No other network and bowl game has been paired for a longer period of time.

References

Sun Bowl
Sun Bowl
South Florida Bulls football bowl games
Oregon Ducks football bowl games
Sun Bowl
December 2007 sports events in the United States